Cluer is a surname and given name. It may derive from the locations of Clewer near Windsor, Berkshire or Somerset. Alternatively, it may be a variant of the Scottish surname "McClure" or derive from the Gaelic word Mac-Giolla-Uidhir (son of the pale youth or son of Odhar's servant). One Cluer family of London was granted arms in the eighteenth century. The surname may also be a variant of the Irish surname "Clare".

Given name 
 Cluer Dicey (1715–75), English newspaper proprietor

See also 
 Clewer, Berkshire
 McClure (disambiguation)
 McClure (surname)
 Clare (disambiguation)
 Clare (surname)

References

Surnames
Surnames of British Isles origin